Llaksaqucha (Quechua llaksa puna teal (Anas puna); fearful; melting of metals; metal; bronze; a small ceremonial collar, qucha lake, hispanicized spelling Llacsacocha) is a lake in the Paryaqaqa mountain range in the Andes of Peru. It is  located in the Junín Region, Yauli Province, Huay-Huay District. It lies northeast of Uqhu and Qayqu. The lake belongs to the watershed of the Mantaro River.

It is operated by Electroperu

References 

Lakes of Peru
Lakes of Junín Region
Dams in Peru
Buildings and structures in Junín Region